Seyssel is the name of two communes in France:

 Seyssel, Ain, in the Ain département
 Seyssel, Haute-Savoie, in the Haute-Savoie département

Seyssel may also refer to:
 Seyssel AOC, a wine AOC
 Claude de Seyssel, a Savoyard jurist and humanist
 Maximilian Seyssel d’Aix (1776–1855), Bavarian Lieutenant General